Destination Beyond is an album by the American ambient musician Steve Roach, released in 2009.  Roach infuses his signature atmospheric fabric of sound with a springy, trance-like groove reminiscent of the rhythm found in Arc of Passion.

Concept
As the title implies, Destination Beyond is a meditation on motion and the infinite point on the horizon that can never be reached.  The album includes a small introspection on this theme.  Roach writes that the "magnetic pull and drive towards the point on the horizon, towards the destination beyond . . . remains a constant theme and impetus in my life."

Production
Destination Beyond was created with analog synthesizers using real-time processing to produce a "pure natural flow."

Track listing

Personnel
Steve Roach – synthesizers, additional photography
Murray Bolesta – cover images
Sam Rosenthal – layout

See also
Ambient music
Electronic music

References

External links
 Destination Beyond at Projekt Records

2009 albums
Steve Roach (musician) albums
Projekt Records albums